Hollands are a fairly rare breed of large chickens that are dual purpose and originate from America. They are hard to tell from Plymouth rocks and Dominiques, but can be recognized as the Plymouth Rock has colored feet and the Dominique has a rose comb.

History
The breed was developed at the Rutgers Breeding Farms in New Jersey, with birds imported from Holland being crossed with White Leghorns, Rhode Island Reds, New Hampshires, and Lamonas, which created the White Hollands. Another cross that included White Leghorns, Barred Plymouth Rocks, Australorps and Brown Leghorns produced the barred variety of Hollands. Both were accepted by the American Poultry Association in 1949.

General information
 Class: American
 Varieties: White and Barred
 Purpose: Dual (egg and meat)
 Egg Size / Color: Medium / White
 Skin Color: Yellow
 Standard Weights: Cock - 8½lbs; Hen - 6½lbs; Cockerel - 7½lbs; Pullet - 5½lbs
There is also a bantam version of the breed.

Approximate weight

References

External links
 FeatherSite.com Holland Pictures

 

Conservation Priority Breeds of the Livestock Conservancy
Chicken breeds originating in the United States